is  the assistant coach of the Saga Ballooners in the Japanese B.League.

Head coaching record

|-
| style="text-align:left;"|Kumamoto Volters
| style="text-align:left;"|2016-17
| 60||44||16|||| style="text-align:center;"|3rd in B2 Western|||-||-||-||
| style="text-align:center;"|-
|-
| style="text-align:left;"|Kumamoto Volters
| style="text-align:left;"|2017-18
| 60||41||19|||| style="text-align:center;"|2nd in B2 Western|||5||2||3||
| style="text-align:center;"|3rd in B2
|-
| style="text-align:left;"|Kumamoto Volters
| style="text-align:left;"|2018-19
| 60||45||15|||| style="text-align:center;"|1st in B2 Western|||5||1||4||
| style="text-align:center;"|4th in B2
|-

References

1989 births
Living people

Japanese basketball coaches
Kumamoto Volters coaches
People from Sakai, Osaka
Saga Ballooners coaches
University of Salamanca alumni
Wakayama Trians coaches